Utoy is an ABS-CBN primetime fantasy drama series featuring Makisig Morales and Philippines' King of Comedy, Dolphy†. The series is inspired by the children's tale Pinocchio.

Production
The production of the series started early September 2008. The series also contains animation. Dolphy said in an interview that he had a hard time working on scenes with animation. But when Dolphy confirm the news the whole show was canceled according to PEP website when he moved to TV5 (formerly known as 5), until now the show is permanently on shelve.

Cast and characters
 TBA† as Papa Yoyo
 Makisig Morales as Utoy
 Kathryn Bernardo as Abby
 Jhake Vargas as Christian
 Eddie Gutierrez as Luis
 Liza Lorena as Manilyn
 Gloria Diaz as Diana Rose
 Ethel Booba as Fairy Alipia
 Tanya Garcia as Tinkerbell
 Izza Ignacio as Jocelyn
 Jon Avila as Ricky
 Victor Basa as Robin
 Sheryn Regis as Fairy Fantasia
 Melissa Ricks as Emerald
 Eda Nolan as Celine
 Charee Pineda as Cheska
 Jayson Gainza as Bernie
 Will Devaughn as Rico
 Ryan Eigenmann as Wilmar
 James Blanco as Dino
 Rainier Castillo as Exekiel

Trivia
 
After Dolphy moved to TV5 (formerly 5) for his last appearance 2 years after Pidol's Wonderland in 2010, he died on July 10, 2012 at the age of 83 due to multiple organ failure, secondary to complications brought about by pneumonia, chronic obstructive pulmonary disease and acute renal failure, 15 days before his 84th birthday on July 25.

References

Unaired television shows
Philippine drama television series